The Electronic Communications in Probability is a peer-reviewed open access scientific journal published by the Institute of Mathematical Statistics and the Bernoulli Society. The editor-in-chief is Siva Athreya (Indian Statistical Institute). It contains short articles covering probability theory, whereas its sister journal, the Electronic Journal of Probability, publishes full-length papers and shares the same editorial board, but with a different editor-in-chief.

External links 
 

Probability journals
English-language journals
Publications established in 1995
Institute of Mathematical Statistics academic journals
Creative Commons Attribution-licensed journals